In model checking, a subfield of computer science, a timed word is an extension of the notion of words, in a formal language, in which each letter is associated with a positive time tag. The sequence of time tag must be non-decreasing, which intuitively means that letters are received. For example, a system receiving a word over a network may associate to each letter the time at which the letter is received. The non-decreasing condition here means that the letters are received in the correct order.

A timed language is a set of timed words.

Example 
Consider an elevator. What is formally called a letter is could be in fact an information such that "someone press the button on the 2nd floor", or "the doors opened on the third floor". In this case, a timed word is a sequence of actions taken by the elevators and its users, with time stamps to recall those actions. The timed word can then be analyzed by formal method to check whether a property such that "each time the elevator is called, it arrives in less than three minutes assuming that no one held the door for more than fifteen seconds" holds. A statement such as this one is usually expressed in metric temporal logic, an extension of linear temporal logic which allow to express time constraints.

A timed-word may be passed to a model, such as a timed automaton, which will decide, given the letters or actions which already occurred, what is the next action which should be done. In our example, to which floor the elevator must go. Then a program may test this timed automaton and check the above-mentioned property. That is, it will try to generate a timed-word in which the door is never held open for more than fifteen seconds, and in which a user must wait more than three minutes after calling the elevator.

Definition 

References